The Richmond Rebels were a professional American football team based in Richmond, Virginia. They began play in 1964 as a member of the Atlantic Coast Football League. The Rebels became a charter member of the Continental Football League in 1965. The team consistently lost money for its owners, so after the 1966 COFL season the franchise was first put up for sale and then returned to the league. When new ownership could not be found the team's players were offered in a dispersal draft, putting an end to the franchise.

They were the third Richmond team to carry the "Rebels" name. The previous two played in the Virginia-Carolina Football League in 1937, and in the Dixie League/American Association from 1946 to 1950.

Season-by-season

References

Continental Football League teams
American football teams in Virginia
Sports in Richmond, Virginia
American football teams established in 1964
Sports clubs disestablished in 1967
1964 establishments in Virginia
1967 disestablishments in Virginia